Apaustis is a genus of moths of the family Noctuidae.

Species
 Apaustis rupicola (Denis & Schiffermüller, 1775)
 Apaustis theophila (Staudinger, 1866)

References
 Apaustis at Markku Savela's Lepidoptera and Some Other Life Forms
 Natural History Museum Lepidoptera genus database

Acronictinae